Parmotrema amaniense is a species of corticolous lichen in the family Parmeliaceae. Found in Africa, the lichen was originally described by J. Steiner and A. Zahlbruckner as a species of Parmelia in 1926. Krog & Swinscow transferred the taxon to Parmotrema in 1983. Secondary chemicals present in Parmotrema amaniense include alectoronic acid, protocetraric acid, and atranorin. In addition to Tanzania, it has been recorded in Uganda, Angola, Malawi, Mozambique, Sierra Leone, Zambia, and Zimbabwe.

See also
List of Parmotrema species

References

amaniense
Lichen species
Lichens described in 1926
Lichens of Africa
Taxa named by Alexander Zahlbruckner